Bowen Developmental Road is a rural strategic main road in Queensland, Australia. It is part of State Route 77, and functions as a highway.

In its course, the road crosses the Clark Range and Leichhardt Range. Until the station Whynot it is paved. The last  were dirt road but some further sealing was done in 2021.

Route description
State Route 77 departs from the Bruce Highway in a southerly direction, just west of Bowen. From there to Collinsville it is signed as Peter Delamothe Road. From Collinsville onwards the road is signed as Bowen Developmental Road. The road generally follows the route of the railway line to a point south of Collinsville, where the railway continues south to coal mines and the road turns south-west, passing through the locality of Mount Coolon, where the Suttor Developmental Road branches off to the south. From here the road continues south-west until it meets the Gregory Developmental Road in the locality of Belyando.

Northern Australia Roads Program upgrade
The Northern Australia Roads Program announced in 2016 included the following project for the Bowen Developmental Road.

Road sealing
The project for progressive sealing and minor drainage improvements was completed in early 2021 at a total cost of $28.8 million.

Other upgrades

Paving and sealing
A project to pave and seal a further section of the road, at a cost of $15 million, was completed in late 2021.

Major intersections

Sources
Steve Parish: Australian Touring Atlas . Steve Parish Publishing. Archerfield QLD 2007.  . p. 10

References

Highways in Queensland
Roads in Queensland